Paramollugo is a genus of flowering plants belonging to the family Molluginaceae.

Its native range is Caribbean to Guyana, Tropical and Subtropical Old World.

Species:

Paramollugo angustifolia 
Paramollugo cuneifolia 
Paramollugo decandra 
Paramollugo deltoidea 
Paramollugo digyna 
Paramollugo elliotii 
Paramollugo nudicaulis 
Paramollugo simulans 
Paramollugo spathulata

References

Molluginaceae
Caryophyllales genera